Gold is a compilation album by Swedish singer September. It was released on 14 November 2008 by Catchy Tunes. The album marked her first compilation album for her domestic market, including songs from her second and third albums, In Orbit (2005) and Dancing Shoes (2007), respectively.  "Because I Love You", a track previously included on Dancing Shoes, was released as a promotional single for the album on 26 November 2008.

Track listing
All songs written by Jonas von der Burg, Anoo Bhagavan and Niklas von der Burg, except "Looking for Love" written by Steven Elson and Dave Stephenson, and "Midnight Heartache" written by Jonas von der Burg, Anoo Bhagavan, Niklas von der Burg, Donna Weiss and Jackie DeShannon. On the international CD, the track listing differs significantly.

Release history

References

Petra Marklund albums
2008 greatest hits albums